India's Space Activities Bill will provide for a dedicated space legislation for India. The draft was first made public for comments by the Department of Space in November 2017. The bill covers various factors of India's space goals, including international and national obligations, defines offences and subsequent punishments, barriers of entry for private companies, liability for damages caused in space etc. On 5 July 2020, Secretary, Department of Space and Chairman, ISRO K Sivan said that the Space Activities Bill is in its final stages. Accordingly, the Bill will be placed in both house of Parliament. After due parliamentary procedure, the Space Activities Act will pave the way for the formation of space rules. For private companies to start space launches in India, the Act is needed to be in effect.

Present Status 
According to Jitendra Singh, Union Minister of  State, Science and Technology, as on 9 February 2022, the draft bill has completed public and legal consultation. It has now been sent for further approvals for inter-ministerial consultations.

References 

Space programme of India
Indian Space Research Organisation
Space legislation in India